The Holy Spirit Orphanage (Dutch: Heilige Geest- of Arme Wees- en Kinderhuis) was an orphanage in the city of Leiden in the Netherlands. It is a Rijksmonument located on Hooglandse Kerkgracht 17B.

Origin 

The so-called ‘Heilige Geest’ (Holy Ghost or Holy Spirit) was the name of a charitable institution, originating in France, which cared for the poor and needy. In the Dutch city of Leiden the ‘Heilige Geest’ was responsible for regular distribution of food, clothing, and small amounts of coin money. It began in Leiden shortly before 1316 with a group of ‘Heilige Geestmeesters’ (Masters of the Holy Spirit) connected with the Leiden parish of Saint Peter.

Orphanage 

Around the year 1450, the institution purchased a former mansion on the Breestraat, opposite the street currently known as the Papengracht. Initially the building served as an office and warehouse. In 1491 the building was repurposed and became a home for needy and parentless children. This marked the establishment of the ‘Heilige Geest- of Arme Weeshuis’.

Soon, the number of children housed in the orphanage exceeded capacity, forcing the Heilige Geestmeesters to look for a larger building. A new accommodation was found in 1583 in the building of the Vrouwengasthuis (woman’s hospital) on the Hooglandsekerkgracht. The Heilige Geest Orphanage would remain at this location for almost four centuries.

The building complex would undergo three major renovations in this period. The most important of these took place between 1774 and 1778. The merging of the nearby Arme Kinderhuis (Poor Children’s Home) with the Heilige Geest Orphanage necessitated this renovation. The names of the respective institutions were also joined in the unwieldy designation ‘Heilige Geest- of Arme Wees en Kinderhuis’. It was by this name that the orphanage was known well into the twentieth century.

Present day 

The Heilige Geest Orphanage remained on the Hooglandse kerkgracht until 1961, still carrying out its mission to care for Leiden’s poor and needy children. The institution became a foundation in 1979 now known as ‘Stichting Heilige Geest- of Arme Wees- en Kinderhuis te Leiden’, caring for the poor and destitute youth in a wider sense. In 1968 the building became a Rijksmonument, a Dutch national heritage site.

At the end of the twentieth century, to further promote the study of its history, the foundation commissioned a new inventory of the archives of the Heilige Geest Orphanage, which dates back to the fourteenth century, as well as a study of the building history and the realization of the score of the Music for Christmas 1796 composed by Christian Friedrich Ruppe for the mixed youth choir of the orphanage.

References

Notes

Bibliography
 P.J. Blok, Geschiedenis eener Hollandsche stad, Den Haag, 1912, 1916
 D.E.H. de Boer, ‘Te vongelinc geleit. Sociale en economische problemen in Leiden aan het eind van de middeleeuwen’, in: Leidse facetten. Tien studies over Leidse geschiedenis, Zwolle, 1982, p. 7-2
 J.F. Dröge, ‘Waar de wezen in de gevel staan’. De bouwgeschiedenis van het Heilige Geest- of Arme Wees- en Kinderhuis aan de Hooglandse kerkgracht te Leiden, Leiden, 1990. 
 S.W.M.A. den Haan, Inventaris van het archief van het Heilige Geest- of Arme Wees- en Kinderhuis te Leiden 1334-1979, Leiden, 1990 (preface). 
 Chr. Ligtenberg, De armezorg te Leiden tot het einde van de 16e eeuw, Den Haag, 1908
 L.G. L[e] P[oole], Catalogus van de stukken en boeken in het archief van het Heilige Geest- of Arme Wees- en Kinderhuis te Leiden, Leiden, 1902 (preface)

Buildings and structures in Leiden
Rijksmonuments in Leiden